Hylaeaicum meeanum is a species of flowering plant in the family Bromeliaceae, endemic to Brazil (the state of Amazonas). It was first described in 1975 as Neoregelia meeana. It was first collected by Margaret Mee, near the source of Rio Andirá, near Parintins. It may be treated as a synonym of Hylaeaicum levianum (as Neoregelia leviana), but  was accepted by Plants of the World Online and the Encyclopaedia of Bromeliads.

References

Bromelioideae
Flora of Brazil
Plants described in 1975